Persatuan Sepakbola Kaimana (also known as Perseka Kaimana) is an Indonesian football club based in Kaimana Regency, West Papua. They currently compete in the Liga 3.

Honours
2010-11 : Position 4th Division 2 (promotion to Division 1)
2011-12 : Champions Division 1 (promotion to Premier Division)

References

External links
Liga-Indonesia.co.id

Perseka Kaimana on Facebook

Football clubs in Indonesia
Football clubs in West Papua (province)
Association football clubs established in 2003
2003 establishments in Indonesia